This is an incomplete list of cathedrals in Greece.

Roman Catholic

Cathedrals of the Roman Catholic Church in Greece (Diocese in brackets):
 Cathedral Basilica of St. Dionysious in Athens (Athens)
 Cathedral of St. Nicolaos in Chios (Chios)
 Cathedral of St. Jacob (or James) and Christopher in Corfu (Corfu, Zakynthos, and Cephalonia)
 Cathedral of the Assumption in Chania (Crete)
 Cathedral of Our Lady of the Rosary in Xinara, Tinos (Naxos, Tinos, Andros and Mykonos)
 Co-Cathedral of the Presentation of the Lord in Chora
 Cathedral of St. Francis of Assisi in Rhodes (Rhodes)
 Cathedral of St. John the Baptist in Santorini (Santorini)
 Cathedral of St. George in Syros (Syros)
 Cathedral of the Immaculate Conception in Thessalonika (Thessalonika)

Former cathedrals
 Former Cathedral of St. John in Rhodes
 Former Cathedral of St. Mary in Castello in Rhodes

Greek Catholic
 Cathedral of the Holy Trinity in Athens

Armenian Catholic
 Armenian Church of St. Gregory the Illuminator in Athens

Greek Orthodox

 
 Metropolitan Cathedral of Athens in Athens
 Agios Minas Cathedral in Heraklion
 St Andrew's Cathedral in Patras
Drama Cathedral, Presentation of the Virgin Mary
 Naxos Cathedral in Naxos
 Cathedral of Saint Nectarios in Aegina
 Orthodox Metropolitan Cathedral in Fira, Santorini
 Presentation of the Virgin Mary Holy Metropolitan Orthodox Church, Chania, Crete
 Cathedral Church of St Nicholas in Volos
 Cathedral of the Three Hierarchs in Skiathos
 Holy Cathedral Church of Agia Paraskevi Lagada in Langadas
 Holy Cathedral of St. Athananasiou in Didymoteicho
 Cathedral of The Annunciation of Our Lady on Lesbos

See also

Lists of cathedrals by country

References

 
Greece
Cathedrals
Cathedrals